Phogat is a village in the Charkhi Dadri district of the Indian state of Haryana.

References 

Villages in Charkhi Dadri district